Christ the King College is a secondary school in Sierra Leone.

Christ the King College may also refer to:

 Christ the King College, Isle of Wight, England
 Christ the King College, Jhansi, India
 Christ the King College, Onitsha, Nigeria
 Christ the King College (Gingoog), Philippines
 Christ the King College (La Union), Philippines

See also
 Christ the King School (disambiguation)